The Senegal national handball team is the national handball team of the Senegal.

African Championship record

External links

IHF profile

Men's national handball teams
National sports teams of Senegal